Howard Steven Friedman (born June 10, 1972) is a prominent American statistician, data scientist, health economist, and writer who teaches at Columbia University

Friedman is widely known for his role as a lead statistical modeler on a number of key United Nations projects and for his wide-ranging publications in the fields of statistics, data science and health economics.

Biography

Career
Friedman was born in New York City and received his bachelor's degree from Binghamton University in applied physics in 1993, where he was a National Merit Scholar.  He received a master's in statistics in 1998 and PhD in biomedical engineering from Johns Hopkins University in 1999.  His thesis work focused on neural representations of object color through neurophysiological records of awake, behaving monkeys.  This research leveraged a visual phenomenon known as Troxler's fading which is related to color filling-in to explore how object color is represented in the visual cortex. He has also contributed to areas of changepoint detection as it applies to neurophysiology.

Friedman was awarded a number of awards during his undergraduate and graduate career including the National Merit Scholarship, Whitaker Foundation Fellowship and the National Science Foundation Graduate Research Fellowship NSF-GRF

Following his dissertation work, Friedman took a position as a director at Capital One where he led teams of statisticians, analysts and programmers in various areas of operations and marketing.  He left Capital One to form Analytic Solutions LLC in 2003 which provided consulting services in areas of designing, developing and modeling data and served as Chief Data Scientist for DataMed Solutions LLC and Sygeny LLC.

He has worked with the United Nations where he led a large number of research projects related to data analytics and health economics.  He is credited with being the lead developer of the Integrated Health Model (used for costing the Health-related Millennium Development Goals within UNDP) and the Reproductive Health Costing Tool in UNFPA
He is a lead scientist for the interagency collaboration among UNICEF, World Bank, World Health Organization, UNFPA, UNAIDS and UNDP for the development of the OneHealth Tool, a project sponsored by the IHP+. In 2014, he was a Visiting Researcher at Oxford University's Department of Economics.

Friedman is the author of over 100 scientific articles and book chapters in areas of applied statistics, health economics and politics and has created data science courses using R, Python, SQL and SAS software.

Personal
Friedman was born in New York City. His father worked as a math teacher, his mother worked as an early education teacher.

Literature and artwork
In addition to his scientific career, Friedman is an accomplished artist and writer.  His formal art training was at both Binghamton University and the School of Visual Arts.  His first book, Angels and Stardust, featured original poetry and artwork.  In his doctoral thesis, he quoted both Ozymandias and Angels and Stardust in the preface.  His paintings have been displayed in a number of New York City venues.

His recent writing is focused on political analysis leveraging his statistics and United Nations experience have been published in numerous online venues including the Huffington Post, and cnbc.com.

In June 2012, Prometheus Books released his book Measure of a Nation.  This book focuses on how to improve America by first comparing its performance with thirteen competitive industrial nations, then identifying the best practices found throughout the world that can be adopted here in the United States.  Measure of a Nation was named by Jared Diamond as the best book of 2012 in an interview  published in the New York Times.

Friedman released an e-book, A Modest Proposal for America, in May 2013 through Foreword Literary that combines an opening satire on America with an analysis of US federal government finances.

In 2020, the University of California Press published Ultimate Price, a book that examines how human life is valued.

He has published textbooks on applied data science including 'Establishing Causal Inferences: Propensity Score Matching, Heckman's Two-Stage Model, Interrupted Time Series, and Regression Discontinuity Models', 'Propensity Score Matching, Adjustment, and Randomized Experiments', and 'Strategic Thinking with Data'

Selected publications

Selected Peer-review publications
E Algur, HS Friedman, E Wang, B Deperthes, A Systematic Global Review of Condom Availability Programs in High Schools, Journal of Adolescent Health 64 (3), 292-304, 2019
L Huicho, P Hernandez, CA Huayanay-Espinoza, ER Segura, Understanding drivers of domestic public expenditure on reproductive, maternal, neonatal and child health in Peru at district level: an ecological study, BMC health services research 18 (1), 833
Sullivan PW, Ghushchyan V, Navaratnam P, Friedman HS, Kavati A, Ortiz B, Lanier B, The national burden of poorly controlled asthma, school absence and parental work loss among school-aged children in the United States J Asthma. 2017 Oct 5:1-9. 
Sullivan PW, Ghushchyan V, Navaratnam P, Friedman HS, Kavati A, Ortiz B, Lanier B, The national cost of asthma among school-aged children in the United States, Ann Allergy Asthma Immunol. 2017 Sep;119(3):246-252.
Keen S, Begum H, Friedman HS, James CD, Scaling up family planning in Sierra Leone: A prospective cost-benefit analysis. Women's Health. 2017 Aug 1:17
J Stover, JE Rosen, MN Carvalho, EL Korenromp, HS Friedman, M Cogan, The case for investing in the male condom. PLoS ONE 12 (5), 2017.
P Sullivan, VG Ghushchyan, P Navaratnam, HS Friedman, A Kavati,, School absence and productivity outcomes associated with childhood asthma in the USA, Journal of Asthma, 1-8, 2017
P Sheehan, K Sweeny, B Rasmussen, A Wils, HS Friedman, J Mahon, et al. Building the foundations for sustainable development: a case for global investment in the capabilities of adolescents The Lancet 2017	
J Ko, J Nicholas, P Navaratnam, H Friedman, F Ernst, V Herrera, Real-World Treatment Persistence Among Multiple Sclerosis Patients on Injectable Disease Modifying Therapies  Neurology 88 (16 Supplement), 2017
J Nicholas, JJ Ko, Y Park, P Navaratnam, HS Friedman, FR Ernst, Assessment of treatment patterns associated with injectable disease-modifying therapy among relapsing–remitting multiple sclerosis patients, Multiple Sclerosis Journal–Experimental, Translational and Clinical 3: 2017
PW Sullivan, V Ghushchyan, P Navaratnam, H Friedman, A Kavati, The National Burden of Asthma in Children in the US: Results from a Nationally Representative Study, Journal of Allergy and Clinical Immunology 139 (2), 
T Nazareth, HS Friedman, P Navaratnam, DA Herriott, JJ Ko, P Barr, Persistency, medication prescribing patterns, and medical resource use associated with multiple sclerosis patients receiving oral disease-modifying therapies: a retrospective medical record review, BMC neurology 16 (1), 187 2016
Rodriguez F, Olufade TO, Ramey DR, Friedman HS, Navaratnam P, Heithoff K, Foody JM. 2016 Gender Disparities in Lipid-Lowering Therapy in Cardiovascular Disease: Insights from a Managed Care Population. J Womens Health (Larchmt) 25(7):697-706
Nazareth T, Friedman HS, Navaratnam P, Herriott DA, Ko JJ, Barr P, Sasane R. 2016. Persistency, medication prescribing patterns, and medical resource use associated with multiple sclerosis patients receiving oral disease modifying therapies: a retrospective medical record review. BMC Neurol. 29;16(1):187.
Reed M, Friedman HS, Navaratnam P, Heithoff K, Simpson RJ Jr., 2016. Resource use and costs in high-risk symptomatic peripheral artery disease patients with diabetes and prior acute coronary syndrome: a retrospective analysis. Postgrad Med. 128(2):170-9.
Chan WW, Waltman Johnson K, Friedman HS, Navaratnam P. 2016. Association between cardiac, renal, and hepatic biomarkers and outcomes in patients with acute heart failure. Hosp Pract (1995). 2016 Aug;44(3):138-45
Chase MR, Friedman HS, Navaratnam P, Heithoff K, Simpson RJ Jr. 2016 Comparative Assessment of Medical Resource Use and Costs Associated with Patients with Symptomatic Peripheral Artery Disease in the United States. J Manag Care Spec Pharm. 22(6):667-75
Ke X, Navaratnam P, Sasane R, Eisenberg Lawrence DF, Friedman HS, Tulsi BB, Vollmer T. 2016 Determinants of high cost in multiple sclerosis patients: a claims and chart review study. Curr Med Res Opin. 32(9):1589-97
Shiferaw S, Mekonnen M, Maïga, A., Akinyemi, A., Amouzou, A., Friedman, H., Barros, A.J. and Hounton, S., 2015. Trends in contraceptive use and distribution of births with demographic risk factors in Ethiopia: a sub-national analysis. Global health action, 8.
Hounton, S., Barros, A.J., Amouzou, A., Shiferaw, S., Maïga, A., Akinyemi, A., Friedman, H. and Koroma, D., 2015. Patterns and trends of contraceptive use among sexually active adolescents in Burkina Faso, Ethiopia, and Nigeria: evidence from cross-sectional studies. Global health action, 8.
Maïga, A., Hounton, S., Amouzou, A., Akinyemi, A., Shiferaw, S., Baya, B., Bahan, D., Barros, A.J., Walker, N. and Friedman, H., 2015. Trends and patterns of modern contraceptive use and relationships with high-risk births and child mortality in Burkina Faso. Global health action, 8.
Akinyemi, A., Adedini, S., Hounton, S., Akinlo, A., Adedeji, O., Adonri, O., Friedman, H., Shiferaw, S., Maïga, A., Amouzou, A. and Barros, A.J., 2015. Contraceptive use and distribution of high-risk births in Nigeria: a sub-national analysis. Global health action, 8.
Friedman HS, Liang M, Banks JL., “Measuring the cost-effectiveness of midwife-led versus physician-led intrapartum teams in developing countries”, Women's Health. 2015 Jul;11(4):553-64. 
Palmer JB, Friedman HS, Waltman Johnson K, Navaratnam P, Gottlieb SS, “Association of Persistent and Transient Worsening Renal Function with Mortality Risk, Re-admissions Risk, Length of Stay, and Costs in Patients Hospitalized with Acute Heart Failure”, ClinicoEconomics and Outcomes Research, June 2015 Volume 2015:7 Pages 357—367
Feldman S., Zhao Y., Navaratnam P., Friedman HS, Lu L., Tran M.H., J, “Patterns of Medication Utilization and Costs Associated With the Use of Etanercept, Adalimumab, and Ustekinumab in the Management of Moderate-to-Severe Psoriasis”. Manag Care Spec Pharm 2015;21(3):201-0
Rodriguez, F; Olufade, T; Heithoff, K; Friedman, HS; Navaratnam, P; “Frequency of High-Risk Patients Not Receiving High-Potency Statin (from a Large Managed Care Database).”, The American Journal of Cardiology 115.2 (Jan 15, 2015): 190-195.
Friedman, H. S., Navaratnam, P., Reardon, G., High, K. P., & Strauss, M. E. A retrospective analysis of clinical characteristics, hospitalization, and functional outcomes in residents with and without Clostridium difficile infection in US long-term care facilities. Curr Med Res Opin. 2014 Jun;30(6):1121-30.
Stenberg, K., Axelson, H., Sheehan, P., Anderson, I., Gülmezoglu, A. M., Temmerman, M., Friedman HS, …& Bustreo, F. Advancing social and economic development by investing in women’s and children’s health: a new Global Investment Framework. The Lancet, 12 April 2014 ( Vol. 383, Issue 9925, Pages 1333-1354 ).
High, K. P., Yogel, R., High, K. P., Friedman, H. S., Navaratnam, P., Reardon, G., & Strauss, M.  A Retrospective Analysis of Clinical Characteristics, Hospitalization, and Humanistic Outcomes in Patients With and Without Clostridium Difficile-Associated Disease in US Long Term Care Facilities. Journal of the American Medical Directors Association, Journal of the American Medical Directors Association, Volume 13, Issue 3, B18 - B19, 2013
Friedman H, Mollon P, Lian J, Navaratnam P. "Clinical Outcomes, Health Resource Use, and Cost in Patients With Early Versus Late Treatment With Dual or Triple Anti-Platelet Treatment for Acute Coronary Syndrome", Am J Cardiovasc Drugs. 2013 Aug;13(4):273-83
Friedman HS, Rajagopalan S, Barnes JP, Roseman H. Combination Therapy with Ezetimibe/Simvastatin Versus Statin Monotherapy for LDL-C Reduction and Goal Attainment in a Real-world Clinical Setting. Clinical Therapeutics. 2011 Feb; 33(2):212-24.
Navaratnam P, Friedman HS Urdaneta E. The impact of adherence and disease control on resource use and charges in patients with mild asthma managed on inhaled corticosteroid agents.  Patient Prefer Adherence 2010 (4) pp. 197–205
Friedman HS, Navaratnam P, McLaughlin J. Adherence and asthma control with mometasone furoate versus fluticasone propionate in adolescents and young adults with mild asthma. J of Asthma Vol 47, Issue: 9, 2010 Nov, pp 994–1000
Navaratnam P, Friedman HS, Urdaneta E. Mometasone furoate vs fluticasone propionate with salmeterol: multivariate analysis of resource use and asthma-related charges. Curr Med Res Opin. 12 October 2009.
Friedman HS, Song X, Crespi S, Navaratnam P.  Comparative Analysis of Length of Stay, Total Costs, and Treatment Success between Intravenous Moxifloxacin 400 mg and Levofloxacin 750 mg among Hospitalized Patients with Community-Acquired Pneumonia. Value in Health. 20 August 2009
Friedman HS, Eid NS, Crespi S, Wilcox TK, Reardon G. Retrospective claims study of fluticasone propionate/salmeterol fixed-dose combination use as initial asthma controller therapy in children despite guideline recommendations. Clin Ther. 2009 May;31(5):1056-63.
Loftus EV Jr, Friedman HS, Delgado DJ, Sandborn WJ. Colectomy subtypes, follow-up surgical procedures, postsurgical complications, and medical charges among ulcerative colitis patients with private health insurance in the United States. Inflamm Bowel Dis. 2009 Apr;15(4):566-75.
Friedman H, Wilcox T, Reardon G, Crespi S, Yawn BP. A retrospective study of the use of fluticasone propionate/salmeterol combination as initial asthma controller therapy in a commercially insured population. Clin Ther. 2008 Oct;30(10):1908-17.
Loftus EV, Delgado DJ, Friedman HS, Sandborn WJ. Colectomy and the Incidence of Post-Surgical Complications among Ulcerative Colitis Patients with Private Health Insurance In The United States American Journal of Gastroenterology, 103(7):1737-4, 2008
Friedman HS., Tencer T., Chan W. Impact of HIV and HCV Infection on Hospitalization and Resource Use Among Hemophilia Enrollees in Commercial Health Plans. J Manag Care Pharm. Nov-Dec;13(9):790-8, 2007
Friedman HS., Yawn BP. Resource utilization in asthma: combined fluticasone propionate/salmeterol compared with inhaled corticosteroids. Current Medical Research & Opinion. 23(2):427-34, 2007
Keating KN., Friedman HS., Perfetto EM. Moxifloxacin versus levofloxacin for treatment of acute rhinosinusitis: a retrospective database analysis of treatment duration, outcomes, and charges. Current Medical Research & Opinion. 22(2):327-33, 2006
Keating KN., Friedman H., Perfetto EM. Fluoroquinolone therapy for uncomplicated skin and skin structure infections: A retrospective database comparison of treatment duration, failures and charges. Clinical Drug Investigation. Vol. 25(10)(pp 621–631), 2005
Friedman HS, Zhou H, von der Heydt R The coding of uniform color figures in monkey visual cortex. J Physiol (Lond) 548: 593-613 figures in monkey visual cortex. J Physiol (Lond) 548: 593-613, 2003
von der Heydt R, Zhou H, Friedman HS, "Representation of stereoscopic edges in monkey visual cortex", Vision Research 40:1955-1967, 2000.
Zhou H, Friedman HS, von der Heydt R, "Coding of border ownership in monkey visual cortex", Journal of Neuroscience 20: 6594-6611, 2000.
Friedman, HS, Zhou H, von der Heydt R  "Color filling-in under steady fixation: behavioral demonstration in monkeys and humans." Perception. 1999;28(11):1383-95.
Friedman, HS, Priebe, C.E.  "Smoothing Bandwidth Selection for Response Latency Estimation", Journal of Neuroscience Methods, 87:13-16, 1999.
Friedman, HS, Priebe, C.E., "Estimating Stimulus Response Latency," Journal of Neuroscience Methods, 83:185-194, 1998.
Nelson, C.A., Friedman, HS, Goozovat, T.S., Klein, J.A., Kneller, L. R., Perry W.J., Ustin, S.A., "Stage-two spin-correlation functions: tests from non-CKM-type leptonic CP violation in tau to rho nu decay", Physical Review D, 50(7): 4544-57, 1994.

Book publications
Friedman, Howard Steven Ultimate Price: The Value We Place on Life, 2020
Friedman, Howard Steven and Thurman, Paul Strategic Thinking with Data, 2019
Friedman, Howard Steven, Establishing Causal Inferences: Propensity Score Matching, Heckman's Two-Stage Model, Interrupted Time Series, and Regression Discontinuity Models, 2016
Friedman, Howard Steven, A Modest Proposal for America, Foreword Literary, 2013
Friedman, Howard Steven, Measure of a Nation, Prometheus Books, 2012
Friedman, Howard Steven and Thurman, Paul Propensity Score Matching, Adjustment, and Randomized Experiments, 2011
von der Heydt, R., Friedman, H. S., & Zhou, H. Searching for the neural mechanisms of color filling-in. In: Filling-in: From Perceptual Completion to Cortical Reorganization, eds. Pessoa, L. & De Weerd, P., pp. 106–127. Oxford University Press, Oxford, 2003
von der Heydt R, Friedman HS, Zhou H.  Searching for the neural mechanisms of color filling-in. In: Filling-in: From Perceptual Completion to Skill Learning (Pessoa L, De Weerd P, eds), Oxford University Press, 2002
von der Heydt R, Zhou H, Friedman HS  Neural coding of border ownership: Implications for the theory of figure-ground perception. In: Perceptual Organization in Vision: Behavioral and Neural Perspectives (Behrmann M, Kimchi R, Olson CR, eds), Lawrence Erlbaum Associates, 2002
Friedman, HS, Neural Mechanisms of Object Color Representation in Areas V1, V2, and V4 of Macaque Visual Cortex, Ph.D. Thesis, 1998
Friedman, HS, Angels and Stardust, Brunswick Publishing, 1995
Friedman, HS, GaAs fluorescence detection of polarized electron beam. In: Stanford Linear Accelerator Center Summer Research, Stanford University Press, 1992

Major United Nations related publications (analyst or co-author)
 State of the World Population Report (2010-2017)
 Economics of Social Determinants of Health and Health Inequalities led by WHO (2013)
Causal Inference and the Millennium Development Goals (MDGs): Assessing Whether There Was an Acceleration in MDG Development Indicators Following the MDG Declaration (2013)
OneHealth Tool Manual and FAQs Collaboration with other UN agencies (2012)
UNFPA Contributor to "Financing of health systems to achieve the Health Millennium Development Goals in low-income countries" Lancet 2010; 375: 419–26 (2010)
Updated Adding It Up Monograph: Collaboration with Guttmacher Institute (2009)
Donor Support Report: UNFPA Commodity management Branch (2009)
Thematic Trust Fund Report: UNFPA Commodity Management Branch (2009)
The Case for Asia and the Pacific (2009)
MDG Calculation Estimates: Collaboration with other UN agencies (2009)
A Guide for Tools For Assessments in Sexual and Reproductive Health (2009)
ICPD Updated Costing Estimates: Collaboration with other UN agencies, academic institutions and organizations. (2009)
Contraceptive Projections and the Donor Gap (Meeting the Challenge) (2009)
High Level Task Force Impact Estimation: Collaboration with other UN agencies, academic institutions and organizations. (2009)
Updated Adding It Up Monograph: Collaboration with Guttmacher Institute (2009)
Donor Support Report: UNFPA Commodity Management Branch (2008)
Thematic Trust Fund Report: UNFPA Commodity Management Branch (2008)
Meeting the Gap: Collaboration with Futures Institute, John Snow International (2008)
Adding It Up Monograph: Collaboration with Guttmacher Institute (2008)
Donor Support Report: UNFPA Commodity management Branch (2007)

References

1972 births
American statisticians
American male non-fiction writers
American artists
Living people
American officials of the United Nations
HuffPost bloggers
Columbia University faculty
Columbia School of International and Public Affairs faculty
Binghamton University alumni
Johns Hopkins University alumni